S Awful Nice is an album by Ray Conniff and His Orchestra. It was released in 1958 on the Columbia label (catalog no. CS-8001).

The album debuted on Billboard magazine's popular albums chart on June 23, 1958, peaked at No. 9, and remained on that chart for 43 weeks.

AllMusic later gave the album a rating of three stars.

Track listing
Side 1
 "(When Your Heart's On Fire) Smoke Gets In Your Eyes" (Jerome Kern, Otto Harbach)
 "Lullaby of Birdland" (George Shearing, George David Weiss)
 "June in January" (Ralph Rainger, Leo Robin)
 "I Cover The Waterfront" (Edward Heyman, Johnny Green)
 "The Very Thought of You" (Ray Noble)
 "It Had To Be You" (Isham Jones, Gus Kahn)

Side 2
 "Paradise" (Nacio Herb Brown, Gordon Clifford)
 "April In Paris" (Yip Harburg, Vernon Duke)
 "That Old Feeling" (Lew Brown, Sammy Fain)
 "Say It Isn't So" (Irving Berlin)
 "All the Things You Are" (Jerome Kern, Oscar Hammerstein II)
 "Lovely to Look At" (Jerome Kern, Dorothy Fields, Jimmy McHugh)

References

1958 albums
Columbia Records albums
Ray Conniff albums